Article One (Art.1), officially Article 1 – Democratic and Progressive Movement (Articolo 1 – Movimento Democratico e Progressista, Art.1–MDP), is a social-democratic political party in Italy.

Art.1 was formed in February 2017 by a left-wing split from the Democratic Party (PD) and soon joined by a group of splinters from Italian Left (SI). The party is led by its secretary Roberto Speranza. Among its leading members are former Prime Minister Massimo D'Alema, former PD secretaries Pier Luigi Bersani and Guglielmo Epifani, and Arturo Scotto.  Enrico Rossi, then President of Tuscany, was among the founding members, before returning into the PD one year later. In December 2017, Art.1 was a founding member of Free and Equal (LeU), a left-wing joint list for the 2018 general election.

Most of the party's members were formerly affiliated to the Democrats of the Left (DS). The name refers to article 1 of the Italian Constitution that defines Italy as "a democratic republic based on labour" (una Repubblica democratica, fondata sul lavoro) and affirms popular sovereignty. The party is an observer member of the Party of European Socialists.

Art.1 leader Speranza has served as Minister of Health in 2019–2022, in the second Conte government and the Draghi government.

History

Background
Following the 2013 leadership election of the Democratic Party (PD), in which Matteo Renzi, a centrist, was elected secretary, an internal struggle arose within the party between Renzi's large majority (composed of Renziani, assorted centrists and moderate social democrats) and the left-wing factions, which were very critical of Renzi, his government (2014–2016) and his proposed constitutional reform, which would eventually be voted down in a constitutional referendum in December 2016.

After the splits of Possible (Pos) and Future to the Left (FaS), the standard-bearers of the PD's internal left were Enrico Rossi (leader of the Democratic Socialists faction and President of Tuscany) and Roberto Speranza (leader of Reformist Area and former PD leader in the Chamber of Deputies). These were backed by former DS or PD leaders Massimo D'Alema, Pier Luigi Bersani and Guglielmo Epifani. Rossi and Speranza criticised Renzi on many of his policies and they were joined by Michele Emiliano, President of Apulia. In February 2017 Renzi resigned from secretary, triggering a new leadership election in a couple of months' time. This was not enough for the dissidents, who wanted a lengthier internal debate and a leadership election after the summer, while supporting Paolo Gentiloni's government and opposing an early general election.

At the same time, at the left of the PD, Left Ecology Freedom (SEL) was in the process of merging into the Italian Left (SI), along with minor parties and associations (notably including FaS). A group of SI dissidents, led by Arturo Scotto (once a member of the DS too) and Massimiliano Smeriglio (who, like most SI members, hailed from the Communist Refoundation Party, PRC), were interested in joining the Progressive Camp (CP), a would-be and never established political party launched by Giuliano Pisapia, but they finally decided to join with the PD splinters.

Foundation
The new party was launched on 25 February 2017 during a convention in Rome. In that occasion, those who left the PD included Vasco Errani, former President of Emilia-Romagna, and deputy minister of the Interior Filippo Bubbico, while Emiliano decided to challenge Renzi in the party's "primaries" instead.

Subsequently, 24 deputies and 14 senators left the PD and formed autonomous parliamentary groups both in the Chamber and the Senate. They were joined by 17 deputies and one senator from SI, two deputies from the Mixed Group, one from Civics and Innovators, and one senator from the For the Autonomies group; among these, one deputy and two senators were former members of the Five Star Movement. The groups elected Francesco Laforgia and Maria Cecilia Guerra as leaders, respectively. Deputies and senators were followed by three members of the European Parliament: Antonio Panzeri, Massimo Paolucci and Flavio Zanonato.

In October MDP's only member of the government (Bubbico) resigned, and the party stopped supporting the Gentiloni Cabinet.

Free and Equal
On 3 December 2017 the MDP was a founding member, along with SI and POS, of Free and Equal (LeU), the left-wing joint list for the 2018 general election, which chose the President of the Senate and former anti-Mafia prosecutor Pietro Grasso as its leader and candidate for Prime Minister.

In the election LeU won 3.4% of the vote, obtaining 14 deputies and four senators. Among these, the MDP had seven deputies (Speranza, Bersani, Epifani, Federico Conte, Federico Fornaro, Michela Rostan and Nico Stumpo) and two senators (Errani and Laforgia). Fornaro was elected president of LeU's parliamentary group in the Chamber.

In November 2018 the MDP, which was focused on forming a brand-new "red-green" party, de facto abandoned LeU.

In April 2019 the MDP became a full-fledged party, welcoming new members, notably including David Tozzo from Possible, and being renamed simply as Article One. Additionally, after Nicola Zingaretti's victory in the 2019 Democratic leadership election, a rapprochement started between the two parties. In the run-up to the 2019 European Parliament election Article One formed a joint list with the PD, which included some minor groups.

Government participation

In August 2019 tensions grew within the coalition supporting the Giuseppe Conte's first government, leading to the issuing of a motion of no-confidence by the League. During the following government crisis, the national board of the PD officially opened to the possibility of forming a new cabinet in a coalition with the M5S, based on pro-Europeanism, green economy, sustainable development, fight against economic inequality and a new immigration policy. The party also accepted that Conte might continue at the head of a new government, and on 29 August President Mattarella formally invested Conte to do so. The LeU groups had previously already announced their possible support to Conte's second government, which was finally unveiled in September with the appointment of Speranza as Minister of Health.

Following the collapse of Conte's second government on 18 January 2021, and the resulting 2021 Italian government crisis, LeU joined the national unity government of Mario Draghi, with Speranza continuing in his post as Minister of Health.

On 31 December 2021, during an online event reserved to Art.1 party executives, Massimo D'Alema explained that the party would start discussions aimed to the dissolution of Art.1 back into the Democratic Party.

In October 2022, the party became an observer member of the Party of European Socialists.

Election results

Italian Parliament

European Parliament

Regional Councils

Leadership
Coordinator/Secretary: Roberto Speranza (2017–present)
Coordinator: Arturo Scotto (2019–present)
President: Pier Luigi Bersani (2018–present)
Leader in the Chamber of Deputies: Francesco Laforgia (2017–2018)
Leader in the Senate: Maria Cecilia Guerra (2017–2018)

Symbols

References

External links
Official website

2017 establishments in Italy
Centre-left parties in Europe
Democratic socialist parties in Europe
Left-wing politics in Italy
Political parties established in 2017
Progressive parties in Italy
Social democratic parties in Italy
Democratic Party (Italy) breakaway groups